Crazy Frog (originally known as The Annoying Thing) is a Swedish CGI-animated character and Eurodance musician created in 2003 by actor and playwright Erik Wernquist. Marketed by the ringtone provider Jamba!, the character was originally created to accompany a sound effect produced by Daniel Malmedahl while attempting to imitate the sound of a two-stroke engine.

The Crazy Frog spawned a worldwide hit single with a cover version of "Axel F" (from the soundtrack of Beverly Hills Cop), which reached the number one spot in Turkey, New Zealand, Australia and most of Europe. The subsequent album Crazy Frog Presents Crazy Hits and second single "Popcorn" also enjoyed worldwide chart success, and a second album entitled Crazy Frog Presents More Crazy Hits was released in 2006, as well as a third album, Everybody Dance Now, released in 2009. The Crazy Frog also spawned many singles, a range of merchandise and toys, as well as two video games before going on hiatus in 2009.

On 22 April 2020, a Twitter account for the character was created, and the account is listed on the official website, Facebook profile and YouTube channel. A new album was announced later that same day. On 10 December 2021, a new single, "Tricky" was released after a 12-year hiatus.

History 
In 1997, 17-year-old Gothenburg student Daniel Malmedahl recorded himself imitating the noises produced by a two stroke engine. He posted this on a website and caught the attention of a Swedish television researcher, who convinced Daniel to perform the sound live on air. After it debuted on television, recordings of his performance began appearing on file sharing networks and various websites under the filename "2TAKTARE.MP3" ("Tvåtaktare" is Swedish for "two stroker").

The sound was adopted as the sound of a Formula One car as early as 2001 in the form of "Deng Deng Form" and later "The Insanity Test" both of which were a static background of a Ferrari Formula One car accompanied by the sound.

In late 2003, another Swede, Erik Wernquist, encountered the sound effect and, not knowing about the previous incarnations of the sound, was inspired to create the 3D animated character he named "The Annoying Thing" to accompany it. Wernquist worked on the first animation in his spare time using the LightWave 3D modeling application, and the whole process took between six and eight weeks. On 7 October 2003 he posted it on his website and on the CGTalk forum.

The animation was a popular attraction at Wernquist's website, but the sound was credited to "Anonymous". Eventually, word reached Malmedahl that his impressions had been used in a now well-known animation studio. He contacted Wernquist, apparently giving an impromptu performance to confirm his claims. Wernquist was convinced, and gave credit to Malmedahl for his creation.

The animation received attention through filesharing and word of mouth and, when Ringtone Europe and Jamster België (now both merged into Jamba!) got wind of this, realizing the monetary possibilities through capitalizing on the underground cult-status, they licensed the rights to the creation, renaming it "Crazy Frog" and starting to market it in mid-2004.

In an interview with HitQuarters, Wernquist expressed his displeasure at the choice of name:

Following 2009, the character went on hiatus. In 2018, a trademark claim by Kaktus Films, the original owners alongside Erik Wernquist, had music listed as one of many rights. On 22 April 2020, an official Twitter account for the character was created, and later that day it was announced that a new album was in development.

In April 2022, the Government of Ukraine uploaded a video on Facebook of Russian tanks being hit by Ukrainian strikes during the 2022 Russian invasion of Ukraine with Crazy Frog playing in the background.

Other media

Racing games 
On 1 July 2005, UK-based publishers Digital Jesters announced that they had acquired the rights to the video game licence for the Crazy Frog. Crazy Frog Racer (featuring the Annoying Thing), released in December 2005 on PlayStation 2 and PC as a racing game. A year later in 2006 a sequel was released, entitled Crazy Frog Racer 2. Both were extremely panned by critics.

Merchandise 
A string of Crazy Frog merchandise was released in the UK.

Cancelled TV series 
In 2005, the German production company The League of Good People was in talks with broadcasters about a TV series based on Crazy Frog. The TV series was cancelled.

Australian tour 
The Crazy Frog toured Australia in late 2005, beginning in Perth on 4 December and continuing through other major capital cities. He made appearances at numerous shopping centres and major hospitals around the country.

Cancelled feature film 
In 2007, the Animation World Network wrote in connection with The Annoying Thing that there was a "planned feature film" to "be completed by the end of next year" into an animated feature film. The feature film was cancelled.

Documentary 
In 2017, a documentary called "The Not So Crazy Frog" was released, originally made in 2012.

Discography 
The Crazy Frog was broadcast for the first time on Belgian television in mid-2004, though was named the Annoying Thing There it was marketed as Albert Motàr.

"Axel F" (a remix of the 1980s Harold Faltermeyer song produced by the German band Resource) was released on 23 May 2005 and became one of the most successful singles of the year 2005. The single debuted at number one in the UK, remaining there for four weeks, and it was released on the debut album Crazy Frog Presents Crazy Hits.

Albums

Singles

Controversies

Genitals
In February 2005, viewers submitted a number of complaints to the United Kingdom's Advertising Standards Authority (ASA) regarding Jamster's advertising campaign, complaining that Crazy Frog appeared to have a visible penis and scrotum. Some parents claimed that it was inappropriate for children. There were also complaints regarding the frequency with which the advertisement appeared on television, reportedly up to twice an hour across most of the day, with some channels showing it more than once per commercial break.

The ASA did not uphold the complaints, pointing out that the advert was already classified as inappropriate for airing during children's television programmes as it contained a premium rate telephone number, and that it was the broadcasters' decision how often an advertisement should be shown. Jamster voluntarily censored the character's genital area in later broadcasts of its advertisements. Similar action occurred in Australia, with similar results. In November 2021, the Crazy Frog Twitter account made light of the controversy, saying, "A lot of people were shocked to see my PP in 2005. And still shocked to see it now in 2021!!"

Computer virus

In March 2005, anti-virus vendors discovered the "W32/Crog.worm" computer virus (a contraction of Crazy Frog), which spreads through file-sharing networks and MSN Messenger, exploiting the Crazy Frog notoriety with a promise of an animation depicting his demise.

Ringtone advertisements
In April 2005, UK television viewers complained about misleading advertisements produced by Jamba!, trading as Jamster and RingtoneKing. Viewers felt that it was not made sufficiently clear that they were subscribing to a service, rather than paying a one-time fee for their ringtone. The complaints were upheld.

As the authority had already adjudicated on the matter and confirmed the matter was not within its remit, the unusual step was taken of adding a notice to the ASA's online and telephone complaints system informing viewers that Jamster!-related complaints should be directed towards the broadcaster or the regulator, Ofcom.

In May 2005, viewers inundated the ASA with new complaints regarding the continuous airing of the latest Crazy Frog advertisements. The intensity of the advertising was unprecedented in British television history. According to The Guardian, Jamster bought 73,716 spots across all TV channels in May alone — an average of nearly 2,378 slots daily — at a cost of about £8 million, just under half of which was spent on ITV. 87% of the population saw the Crazy Frog adverts an average of 26 times, 15% of the adverts appeared twice during the same advertising break and 66% were in consecutive ad breaks. An estimated 10% of the population saw the advert more than 60 times. This led to many members of the population finding the Crazy Frog, as its original name suggests, immensely irritating.

On 21 September 2005, the ASA ruled that the Crazy Frog, along with other Jamba ringtone advertisements, could not be shown before 9pm. This adjudication was revised on 25 January 2006, maintaining the 'upheld' decision but revising the wording of one of the points.

Non-fungible token
Following the release of "Tricky" on 10 December 2021, an official non-fungible token release was planned on "Metabeats". This was met with backlash on Twitter, with the account managers stating they had been receiving death threats over the matter. Despite the controversy, they still plan to release the NFTs.

See also 
 Giancarlo Meo
 Gummibär
 Holly Dolly
 Mickael Turtle
 Schnappi
 Schnuffel

Notes 

A  In some territories, "Jingle Bells" was released as a double A-side single with a cover of MC Hammer's "U Can't Touch This", but in others, it was released as a double A-side single with "Last Christmas", which was later released as a single in its own right.

References

External links 

 BBC article: The Crazy Frog sound? That's my fault. Includes an interview with the creator of the sound, Daniel Malmedahl.
 The Times: Crazy Frog turns into a real prince.
 ASA: A Frog's Tale that spawned viewer outrage.
 Erik Wernquist interview
 Interview, HitQuarters Oct 2005

Mascots introduced in 2003
Advertising characters
Male characters in advertising
Virtual influencers
Frog mascots
Internet memes
2000s fads and trends
Swedish Eurodance groups
Fictional frogs
Fictional musicians
Obscenity controversies in music
Universal Music Group artists
Warner Music Group artists